William Scott Horne (July 23, 1936 – April 3, 2022) was an American politician and judge. He was a former Democratic member of the Maryland House of Delegates.

Early life and career
Horne was born in Easton, Maryland, and attended public schools in the area. Before college, he attended The Bolles School in Jacksonville, Florida and the University of Maryland. He served in the United States Army from 1956 to 1958. He graduated from Virginia Tech with a B.S. degree in 1964 and from Tulane University Law School with a LL.B degree in 1965. Horne was admitted to the Maryland Bar in 1966.

Horne first entered into politics in 1968 after being elected Assistant State's Attorney for Talbot County, Maryland, which he served from 1968 to 1971, and as the county's State's Attorney until 1973. Afterwards, he was elected to the Maryland House of Delegates, representing District 35 from 1973 to 1982 and District 37 until 1989. He then served as judge of the Talbot County Circuit Court from 1989 until his retirement in 2005. He died at his home in Easton, Maryland.

In the legislature
Horne was sworn into the Maryland House of Delegates in 1973.

Committee assignments
 Chair, Judiciary Committee, 1987–1989 (member, 1973–1989)
 Member, Legislative Policy Committee, 1987–1989
 Rules and Executive Nominations Committee, 1987–1989.
 Chair, Joint Oversight Committee on Juvenile Services Initiatives
 Co-chair, Task Force on Drunk & Drugged Driving
 Member, Task Force on Crime, 1976–1980
 Juvenile Justice Advisory Committee, 1980–1982
 Advisory Board on Liability, 1980–1982
 Task Force to Study the Maryland Tax Court, 1984–1985
 Member, Atlantic States Marine Fisheries Commission, 1987–1989
 Member, Court of Appeals Standing Committee on Rules of Practice and Procedure, 1987–1989

Other memberships
 Chair, Eastern Shore Delegation, 1983-1987

References

1936 births
2022 deaths
People from Easton, Maryland
Military personnel from Maryland
Virginia Tech alumni
Tulane University Law School alumni
Maryland lawyers
Maryland state court judges
Democratic Party members of the Maryland House of Delegates